Makowiska may refer to the following places:
Makowiska, Bydgoszcz County in Kuyavian-Pomeranian Voivodeship (north-central Poland)
Makowiska, Toruń County in Kuyavian-Pomeranian Voivodeship (north-central Poland)
Makowiska, Lublin Voivodeship (east Poland)
Makowiska, Łódź Voivodeship (central Poland)
Makowiska, Subcarpathian Voivodeship (south-east Poland)
Makowiska, West Pomeranian Voivodeship (north-west Poland)